Mamma Mia! is the fourth extended play from South Korean boy band SF9. It was released on February 26, 2018, by FNC Entertainment. The album consists of six tracks, including the title track, "Mamma Mia".

Commercial performance
The EP sold 11,060+ copies in South Korea. It peaked at number 3 on the Korean Gaon Chart.

Track listing

References

2018 EPs
SF9 (band) EPs
FNC Entertainment EPs
Kakao M EPs